The Battle of Lake Khasan (29 July – 11 August 1938), also known as the Changkufeng Incident in China and Japan, was an attempted military incursion by Manchukuo, a Japanese puppet state, into the territory claimed and controlled by the Soviet Union. That incursion was founded in the Japanese belief that the Soviet Union had misinterpreted the demarcation of the boundary based on the Treaty of Peking between Imperial Russia and Qing China and the subsequent supplementary agreements on demarcation and tampered with the demarcation markers. Japanese forces occupied the disputed area but withdrew after heavy fighting and a diplomatic settlement.

Background
For most of the first half of the twentieth century, there was considerable tension between the Russian (later Soviet), Chinese, and Japanese governments, along their common borders in what became North East China. The Chinese Eastern Railway (CER) was a railway in northeastern China (Manchuria). It connected China and the Russian Far East. The southern branch of the CER, known in the West as the South Manchuria Railway, became the locus and partial casus belli for the Russo-Japanese War and subsequent incidents, leading to the Second Sino-Japanese War and Soviet-Japanese border conflicts. Larger incidents included the Sino-Soviet conflict of 1929 and the Mukden Incident between Japan and China in 1931. The Battle of Lake Khasan was fought between two powers which had long mistrusted each other.

In the period before the battle, a series of purges left the Soviet army with many positions filled by inexperienced officers who feared to take the initiative. In July 1938 alone, four and a half times as many people were purged from the Far Eastern Front (the Soviet command in the region) as in the previous twelve months. This in combination with lack of infrastructure, the overburdening of the front's commander, Marshal Vasily Blyukher (or Blücher), shortage of equipment, and poor organization led to the Front being in poor shape.

The confrontation was triggered in July 1938, when Far Eastern Front and Soviet State Security (NKVD) Border Guard troops reinforced the Khasan border with Manchuria. This was prompted in part by the defection one month before (13 June) of Soviet General G. S. Lyushkov, in charge of all NKVD forces in the Soviet Far East at Hunchun, in the Tumen River area. He provided the Japanese with intelligence on the poor state of Soviet Far Eastern forces and the purge of army officers.

Build-up

On 6 July 1938, the Japanese Kwantung Army decoded a message sent by the Soviet commander in the Posyet region to Soviet headquarters in Khabarovsk. The message recommended that Soviet soldiers be allowed to secure unoccupied high ground west of Lake Khasan, most notably the disputed Changkufeng Heights, because it would be advantageous for the Soviets to occupy terrain which overlooked the Korean port-city of Rajin, as well as strategic railways linking Korea to Manchuria. In the next two weeks, small groups of Soviet border troops moved into the area and began fortifying the mountain with emplacements, observation trenches, entanglements and communication facilities.

At first, the Japanese Korean Army, which had been assigned to defend the area, disregarded the Soviet advance. However, the Kwantung Army, whose administrative jurisdiction overlapped Zhāng Gǔfēng (Changkufeng), pushed the Korean Army to take more action, because it was suspicious of Soviet intentions. Following this, the Korean Army took the matter to Tokyo, recommending that a formal protest be sent to the Soviet Union.

The conflict started on 15 July, when the Japanese attaché in Moscow demanded the removal of Soviet border troops from the Bezymyannaya (сопка Безымянная, Chinese name: Shācǎofēng = 沙草峰) and Zaozyornaya (сопка Заозёрная, Chinese name: Zhāng Gǔfēng = 张鼓峰 (Changkufeng)) Hills to the west of Lake Khasan in the south of Primorye not far from Vladivostok, claiming this territory by the Soviet–Korea border; the demand was rejected.

Battle

The Japanese 19th Division along with some Manchukuo units took on the Soviet 39th Rifle Corps under Grigori Shtern (eventually consisting of the 32nd, 39th and 40th Rifle Divisions, the 2nd Mechanised Brigade and two tank battalions). One of the Japanese Army Commanders at the battle was Colonel Kotoku Sato, the commander of the 75th Infantry Regiment. Lieutenant General Suetaka Kamezo gave Sato an order: "You are to meet out a firm and thorough counterattack without fail, once you gather that the enemy is advancing even in the slightest". The hidden meaning of this was that Sato had been ordered to expel the Soviets from Changkufeng.

On 31 July, Sato's regiment launched a night sortie on the fortified hill. In the Changkufeng sector, 1,114 Japanese engaged a Soviet garrison of 300, eliminating them and knocking out 10 tanks, with casualties of 34 killed and 99 wounded. In the Shachofeng sector, 379 Japanese surprised and routed another 300 Soviet troops, while knocking out seven tanks, for 11 killed and 34 wounded. Thousands more Japanese soldiers from the 19th Division arrived, dug in, and requested reinforcements. High Command rejected the request, as they knew General Suetaka would use these forces to assault vulnerable Soviet positions, escalating the incident. Japanese troops defended the disputed area. In 1933, the Japanese had designed and built a "Rinji Soko Ressha" (Special Armoured Train). The train was deployed at "2nd Armoured Train Unit" in Manchuria and participated in the Second Sino-Japanese War and the Changkufeng conflict against the Soviets, transporting thousands of Japanese troops to and from the battlefield, displaying to the West the capability of an Asian nation to implement western ideas and doctrine concerning rapid infantry deployment and transport.

On 31 July, People's Commissar for Defence Kliment Voroshilov ordered combat readiness for 1st Coastal Army and the Pacific Fleet. The Soviets gathered 354 tanks and assault guns at Lake Khasan, including 257 T-26 tanks (with 10 KhT-26 flame-throwing tanks), three ST-26 bridge-laying tanks, 81 BT-7 light tanks and 13 SU-5-2 self-propelled guns. The chief of the Far East Front, Vasily Blücher, arrived at the front line on 2 August 1938. Under his command, additional forces were moved up and from August 2–9, the Japanese forces at Changkufeng were attacked. Such was the disparity of forces that one Japanese artillery commander observed that the Soviets fired more shells in one day than the Japanese did in the two-week affair. Despite this, the Japanese defenders organized an anti-tank defense, with disastrous results for the poorly coordinated Soviets, whose attacks were defeated with many casualties. Thousands of Soviet troops were killed or wounded and at least 46 (or 45 unoperational because of gun fire and getting stuck in the marshes or damaged or 80 of which 24 completely destroyed) tanks were knocked out, with another 39 damaged to varying degrees.

After the Japanese pushed the Soviet border security unit, later reinforced by the 40th Rifle Division, from the hill and other positions the Japanese dug in while the Soviets reinforced their troops. Unlike the Japanese the Soviets didn't have a railway close to the battlefield, but instead a single unpaved road so when Soviet reinforcements got to the battlefield the Japanese were already well entrenched. The Soviets had attacked Japanese positions by air during the preparations for a ground attack. On the morning before the Soviet attack, 13 Soviet aircraft attacked the hill and 12 the rear of the Japanese forces, even though this isn't documented by all sources. This was followed by an attack of three Soviet infantry regiments, but this attack didn't have artillery or air support, either because of poor preparations or in the case of air support possibly fog. Some sources, however, do claim that two artillery batteries supported the attack. The attack was supported by a tank regiment but regardless it soon stalled. This was largely due to the low preparedness of the Soviet troops. Some of the artillery was not ready, little was known of the Japanese dispositions, communications had not fully been set up and the left wing was not ready to start the attack at the appointed time. Despite the poor state of the Soviet force and the knowledge that the enemy was well entrenched the attack was ordered to go ahead. The tank crews had not been prepared for the hostile terrain so they weren't able to keep up the momentum. During the attack a number of commanders including the commander of the 40th rifle division's tank battalion abandoned their troops.

On August 6 the Soviets renewed their attack. First multiple waves of bombers attacked the Japanese positions. This attack was delayed either because of fog or poor preparations. After the bombers an assault by tanks and infantry, including mechanized troops, supported by artillery was made. In the difficult terrain the tanks suffered heavy losses, only individual tanks made it to their objectives, all of which were destroyed or retreated later. During the attack an outflanking movement was made. The Soviets pushed back the Japanese after heavy fighting, the subsequent days the Japanese counterattacked but were unable to recapture their positions.

The Japanese were pushed back by the Soviet attacks but were still on the battlefield. Despite not being forced off the battlefield, it was clear that the local Japanese units would not be able to keep Changkufeng without widening the conflict. On 10 August, Japanese ambassador Mamoru Shigemitsu asked for peace. Satisfied that the incident had been brought to an "honourable" conclusion, on 11 August 1938, at 13:30 local time the Japanese stopped fighting and Soviet forces reoccupied the heights.

Consequences

More than 6,500 Soviet officers and soldiers were awarded the orders, decorations, and medals of the Soviet Union; 26 of them were awarded the title Hero of the Soviet Union, and 95 were awarded the Order of Lenin.

Soviet losses totalled 792 killed or missing and 3,279 wounded or sick, according to their records and the Japanese claimed to have destroyed or immobilized 96 enemy tanks and 30 guns. Soviet armoured losses were significant, with dozens of tanks being knocked out or destroyed and hundreds of "tank troops" becoming casualties. Japanese casualties, as revealed by secret Army General Staff statistics, were 1,439 casualties (526 killed or missing, 913 wounded); the Soviets claimed Japanese losses of 3,100, with 600 killed and 2,500 wounded. The Soviets concluded that this was because of poor communications infrastructure and roads as well as the loss of unit coherence due to poor organization, headquarters and commanders and a lack of combat supply units. The faults in the Soviet army and leadership at Khasan were blamed on the incompetence of Blyukher. In addition to leading the troops into action at Khasan, Blyukher was also supposed to oversee the trans-Baikal military district's and the far eastern fronts move to combat readiness using an administrative apparatus that delivered army group, army and corps level instructions to the 40th Rifle Division by accident. On 22 October, he was arrested by the NKVD and is thought to have been tortured to death.

The Japanese military, while seriously analyzing the results of the battle, engaged with the Soviets once more, with disastrous results, in the more extensive Battle of Khalkhin Gol (Nomonhan) in 1939. This second engagement resulted in the defeat of the Japanese Sixth Army. After World War II, at the International Military Tribunal for the Far East in 1946, 13 high-ranking Japanese officials were charged with crimes against peace for their roles in initiating hostilities at Lake Khasan.

See also
Ivan Pozharsky, posthumously awarded Hero of the Soviet Union for his participation in the battle.

References

Further reading
Coox, Alvin D. The Anatomy of a Small War: The Soviet-Japanese Struggle for Changkufeng/Khasan, 1938. Westport, Conn.: Greenwood Press, 1977. 
.

External links

Soviet viewpoint map of Russian-Japanese Changkufeng/Lake Khasan Incident
Topographic map of the Lake Khasan area

Lake Khasan
Lake Khasan 1938
Lake Khasan 1938
Khasan Lake battle 1938
Japan–Soviet Union relations
1938 in Japan
1938 in the Soviet Union
July 1938 events
August 1938 events
Soviet–Japanese border conflicts